Nicholas Rees (born February 17, 1982) is a Bahamian former swimmer, who specialized in butterfly events. He is a two-time Olympian (2000 and 2004), a former Caribbean and Bahamian record holder in the 100 m butterfly, a varsity swimmer for the Ohio State Buckeyes, and a graduate of business administration at Ohio State University. Rees later obtained an MBA in International Business from the University of Miami. Nicholas Rees is also the grandson of Lionel Wilmot Brabazon Rees, VC, British war hero, Victoria Cross recipient and advisor to the Crown.

Rees made his first Bahamian team, as an eighteen-year-old junior, at the 2000 Summer Olympics in Sydney, where he competed in the men's 100 m butterfly. Swimming in heat two, and struggling with a crippling shoulder injury, he rounded out a field of eight swimmers to fifty-seventh overall by 0.77 of a second behind Bermuda's Stephen Fahy in 57.23.

At the 2004 Summer Olympics in Athens, Rees qualified again for the 100 m butterfly, by clearing a FINA B-standard entry time of 55.89 from the World Championships in Barcelona, Spain. He challenged seven other swimmers on the second heat, including fellow two-time Olympians Conrad Francis of Sri Lanka and Daniel O'Keeffe of Guam. He raced to a third spot by a 1.52-second margin behind winner Michal Rubáček of the Czech Republic in 56.39. Rees failed to advance into the semifinals, as he placed fiftieth overall in the preliminaries.

References

1982 births
Living people
Bahamian people of British descent
Bahamian male swimmers
Olympic swimmers of the Bahamas
Swimmers at the 1999 Pan American Games
Swimmers at the 2000 Summer Olympics
Swimmers at the 2004 Summer Olympics
Pan American Games competitors for the Bahamas
Male butterfly swimmers
Sportspeople from Nassau, Bahamas
Ohio State Buckeyes men's swimmers
Ohio State University Fisher College of Business alumni
University of Miami Business School alumni